S32 may refer to:

Aviation 
 Blériot-SPAD S.32, a French racing biplane
 Cooperstown Municipal Airport, in Griggs County, North Dakota, United States
 Letov Š-32, a Czechoslovakian airliner
 Short S.32, a British transport aircraft
 Sikorsky S-32, an American sesquipane
 Sukhoi S-32, a prototype Russian fighter aircraft

Naval vessels 
 , a submarine of the Argentine Navy
 
 , a torpedo boat of the Imperial German Navy sunk 1910
 , a torpedo boat of the Imperial German Navy scuttled 1919
 
 , a submarine of the United States Navy

Rail and transit 
 Futamata Station (Hokkaido), in Oshamambe, Hokkaido, Japan
 S32, a line of the Karlsruhe Stadtbahn, in Germany

Roads 
 Jingping Expressway, in Beijing, China
 S32 Xuanhua–Datong Expressway, between Hebei and Shanxi, China
 Shanghai–Jiaxing–Huzhou Expressway, Shanghai, China
 Suzhou–Dengfeng Expressway, Henan, China
 County Route S32 (California), United States
 County Route S32 (Bergen County, New Jersey), United States

Other uses 
 South32, an Australian mining and metals company
 Sulfur-32, an isotope of sulfur
 S32, a postcode district in the Hope Valley, Derbyshire, England